The Polish Film Academy (Polish: Polska Akademia Filmowa) is a professional honorary organization dedicated to the advancement of the arts and sciences of motion pictures.

History 

The academy was founded in 2003 on the initiative of the Independent Film Foundation (Polish: Niezależna Fundacja Filmowa, NFF) and is a national film academy equivalent to other national academies awarding such prizes as French César Awards, Czech Lion Awards or Spanish Goya Awards. 

It is composed of about 600 motion picture professionals from Poland. Membership in the Academy is by invitation only. Membership is based on being judged by all members – professional filmmakers as a nominated for distinguished achievements in filmmaking. The Academy organizes annual Polish Film Academy Awards, now officially known as The Eagle (Orzeł). In 2008 the first president of the Academy was Agnieszka Holland. The current president of the Academy is producer and director Dariusz Jabłoński.

Members 

 Witold Adamek
 Andrzej Albin
 Petro Aleksowski
 Janusz Anderman
 Dżamila Ankiewicz
 Michał Arabudzki
 Andrzej Artymowicz
 Fryderyk Babiński
 Wojciech Badiak
 Filip Bajon
 Albina Barańska
 Andrzej Barański
 Andrzej Barszczyński
 Jarosław Barzan
 Marcin Kot Bastkowski
 Krzysztof Baumiller
 Mateusz Bednarkiewicz
 Ryszard Ber
 Paweł Betley
 Czesław Białczyński
 Joanna Białousz
 Wojciech Biedroń
 Magdalena Biedrzycka
 Anna Biedrzycka-Sheppard
 Irena Biegańska
 Iwona Bielska
 Władysław Bielski
 Daniel Bloom
 Jerzy Blaszyński
 Jacek Bławut
 Katarzyna Boczek
 Jurek Bogajewicz
 Andrzej Bohdanowicz
 Anna Bohdziewicz-Jastrzębska
 Agnieszka Bojanowska
 Włodzimierz Bolecki
 Jacek Borcuch
 Mirosław Bork
 Ewa Borzęcka
 Jacek Braciak
 Lech Brański
 Małgorzata Braszka
 Ewa Braun
 Jacek Brettschneider
 Joszko Broda
 Jacek Bromski
 Ryszard Brylski
 Marek Burgemajster
 Stanisława Celińska
 Iga Cembrzyńska
 Stefan Chazbijewicz
 Maria Chilarecka-Barczyńska
 Tadeusz Chmielewski
 Filip Chodzewicz
 Stefan Chomnicki
 Irena Choryńska
 Marek Chrupała
 Andrzej Chyra
 Magdalena Cielecka
 Małgorzata Corvalan
 Franciszek Czekierda
 Robert Czesak
 Hanna Ćwikło
 Wojciech Danowski
 Grzegorz Daroń
 Wit Dąbal
 Jacek Dąbała
 Maciej Dejczer
 Dariusz Derbich
 Krzesimir Dębski
 Magdalena Dipont
 Mirosław Dobek
 Halina Dobrowolska
 Tomasz Dobrowolski
 Andrzej Domalik
 Barbara Domaradzka
 Piotr Domaradzki
 Tadeusz Drewno
 Maciej Drygas
 Michał Dudziewicz
 Piotr Dumała
 Krzysztof Dumieński
 Zygmunt Duś
 Maciej Dutkiewicz
 Jan Dworak
 Jolanta Dylewska
 Janusz Dymek
 Anna Dymna
 Katarzyna Dzida-Hamela
 Piotr Dzięcioł
 Marian Dziędziel
 Andrzej Dziurawiec
 Paweł Edelman
 Sławomir Fabicki
 Feliks Falk
 Jerzy Fidler
 Milenia Fiedler
 Piotr Figiel
 Katarzyna Figura
 Sławomir Fijałkowski
 Małgorzata Fogel-Gabryś
 Małgorzata Foremniak
 Jolanta Fraszyńska
 Jan Freda
 Barbara Fronc
 Jan Frycz
 Olga Frycz
 Renata Frydrych
 Jerzy Kajetan Frykowski
 Katarzyna Fukacz-Cebula
 Violetta Furmaniuk-Zaorska
 Dariusz Gajewski
 Janusz Gajos
 Janusz Gauer
 Jacek Gawryszczak
 Jacek Gąsiorowski
 Krzysztof Gierat
 Małgorzata Gil
 Przemysław Gintrowski
 Robert Gliński
 Krzysztof Globisz
 Włodzimierz Głodek
 Janusz Głowacki
 Robert Gonera
 Zbigniew Górny
 Andrzej Górny
 Paweł Grabarczyk
 Zbigniew Grabowski
 Grażyna Gradoń
 Krzysztof Gradowski
 Andrzej Grembowicz
 Krzysztof Grędziński
 Agnieszka Grochowska
 Teresa Gruber
 Janusz Grudziński
 Anna Gryczyńska
 Mariusz Grzegorzek
 Jolanta Grzenda
 Cezary Grzesiuk
 Maciej Grzywaczewski
 Gene Gutowski
 Małgorzata Gwiazdecka
 Jacek Gwizdała
 Andrzej Haliński
 Zbigniew Hałatek
 Jacek Hamela
 Piotr Hertel
 Jerzy Hoffman
 Agnieszka Holland
 Zbigniew Hołdys
 Jan Hryniak
 Sławomir Idziak
 Dorota Ignaczak
 Anna Iwaszkiewicz
 Urszula Jabłońska
 Mirosław Jabłoński
 Dariusz Jabłoński
 Monika Jagodzińska
 Andrzej Jakimowski
 Arkadiusz Jakubik
 Krystyna Janda
 Jagna Janicka
 Jerzy Janicki
 Jadwiga Jankowska-Cieślak
 Katarzyna Jarnuszkiewicz
 Marcin Jarnuszkiewicz
 Andrzej J. Jaroszewicz
 Grażyna Jasińska-Wiśniarowska
 Krzysztof Jastrząb
 Ewa Jastrzębska
 Małgorzata Jaworska
 Jerzy Jednorowski
 Andrzej Jeziorek
 Wojciech Jędrkiewicz
 Edyta Jungowska
 Wiesław Jurgała
 Jan A.P. Kaczmarek
 Zdzisław Kaczmarek
 Jan Kaczmarski
 Dorota Kamińska
 Violetta Kamińska
 Jarosław Kamiński
 Jerzy Kapuściński
 Kazimierz Karabasz
 Tomasz Karczewski
 Maciej Karpiński
 Andrzej Kawala
 Jerzy Kawalerowicz
 Grzegorz Kędzierski
 Dorota Kędzierzawska
 Mirosław Kęsiak
 Janusz Kidawa
 Jan Kidawa-Błoński
 Andrzej Kiełczewski
 Krzysztof Kiersznowski
 Wojciech Kilar
 Edward Kłosiński
 Hanna Kłoskowska
 Piotr Knop
 Grażyna Kociniak
 Krystyna Kofta
 Piotr Kokociński
 Jerzy Kolasa
 Jan Jakub Kolski
 Paweł Komorowski
 Barbara Komosińska
 Adrian Konarski
 Jacek Kondracki
 Marek Kondrat
 Zygmunt Konieczny
 Tadeusz Konwicki
 Joanna Kopczyńska
 Leszek Kopeć
 Jacek Koprowicz
 Jacek Korcelli
 Natalia Koryncka-Gruz
 Abel Korzeniowski
 Mikołaj Korzyński
 Andrzej Korzyński
 Tadeusz Kosarewicz
 Barbara Kosidowska
 Joanna Kos-Krauze
 Marcin Koszałka
 Łukasz Kośmicki
 Arkadiusz Kośmider
 Tomasz Kot
 Marek Koterski
 Andrzej Kotkowski
 Andrzej Kowal
 Cezary Kowalczuk
 Andrzej Kowalczyk
 Tomasz Kowalkowski
 Przemysław Kowalski
 Anna Kowarska
 Jan Kozikowski
 Grażyna Kozłowska
 Hanna Kramarczuk
 Anna Krasowska
 Antoni Krauze
 Krzysztof Krauze
 Ewa Krauze
 Grzegorz Królikiewicz
 Rafał Królikowski
 Agnieszka Krukówna
 Ryszard Krupa
 Waldemar Krzystek
 Marcin Krzyżanowski
 Dariusz Kuc
 Kamil Kuc
 Jerzy Kucia
 Grzegorz Kuczeriszka
 Wojciech Kuczok
 Zdzisław Kuczyński
 Mariusz Kuczyński
 Marek Kuczyński
 Boris F. Kudlicka
 Błażej Kukla
 Elżbieta Kurkowska
 Kazimierz Kutz
 Henryk Kuźniak
 Stanisław Kuźnik
 Tatiana Kwiatkowska
 Michał Kwieciński
 Tadeusz Lampka
 Paweł Laskowski
 Stefan Laudyn
 Ryszard Lenczewski
 Wojciech Lepianka
 Elena Leszczyńska
 Witold Leszczyński
 Małgorzata Lewandowska
 Andrzej Lewandowski
 Konstanty Lewkowicz
 Bogusław Linda
 Jacek Lipski
 Olaf Lubaszenko
 Barbara Łagowska
 Antoni Łazarkiewicz
 Magdalena Łazarkiewicz
 Piotr Łazarkiewicz
 Ilona Łepkowska
 Grzegorz Łoszewski
 Paweł Łuczyc-Wyhowski
 Jerzy Łukaszewicz
 Mariusz Łukomski
 Małgorzata Łupina
 Ewa Machulska
 Juliusz Machulski
 Magdalena Maciejewska
 Maciej Maciejewski
 Katarzyna Maciejko-Kowalczyk
 Adam Magajewski
 Krzysztof Magowski
 Bronisław Maj
 Krzysztof Majchrzak
 Janusz Majewski
 Lech Majewski
 Paweł Mantorski
 Robert Mańkowski
 Wojciech Marczewski
 Weronika Marczuk-Pazura
 Jerzy Matuszkiewicz
 Maciej Melecki
 Ryszard Melliwa
 Norbert Mędlewski
 Jerzy R. Michaluk
 Tomasz Michałowski
 Mariusz Mielczarek
 Tomasz Miernowski
 Jacek Mierosławski
 Jerzy Mierzejewski
 Piotr Mikucki
 Marek Miller
 Paweł Mirowski
 Teresa Miziołek
 Jacek Ryszard Mocny
 Jacek Moczydłowski
 Jan Mogilnicki
 Andrzej Mol
 Jerzy Morawski
 Janusz Morgenstern
 Bogdan Mozer
 Leszek Możdżer
 Aleksander Mrożek
 Andrzej Mularczyk
 Paweł Mykietyn
 Zdzisław Najda
 Joanna Napieralska
 Halina Nawrocka
 Zbigniew Niciński
 Włodzimierz Niderhaus
 Wojciech Niżyński
 Wojciech Nowak
 Grzegorz Nowak
 Barbara Nowak
 Leopold René Nowak
 Maria Nowakowska-Majcher
 Marek Nowakowski
 Marek Nowicki
 Marek Nowowiejski
 Ryszard Maciej Nyczka
 Małgorzata Orłowska
 Sławomir Orzechowski
 Jacek Osadowski
 Krzysztof Osiecki
 Zbigniew Osiński
 Dominika Ostałowska
 Waldemar Ostanówko
 Barbara Ostapowicz
 Maja Ostaszewska
 Dorota Ostrowska-Orlińska
 Grzegorz Pacek
 Krzysztof Pakulski
 Dariusz Panas
 Ryszard Patkowski
 Jan Kanty Pawluśkiewicz
 Barbara Pec-Ślesicka
 Jan Peszek
 Ewa Petelska
 Jacek Petrycki
 Jerzy Pękalski
 Grzegorz Piątkowski
 Franciszek Pieczka
 Magdalena Piekorz
 Andrzej Piekutowski
 Krzysztof Piesiewicz
 Marek Piestrak
 Leszek Pieszko
 Dariusz Pietrykowski
 Stefan Pindelski
 Radosław Piwowarski
 Marek Piwowski
 Roman Polański
 Andrzej Połeć
 Czesław Paweł Poppe
 Marcin Pospieszalski
 Kinga Preis
 Ola Prószyńska
 Halina Prugar-Ketling
 Krzysztof Ptak
 Krzysztof Raczyński
 Elżbieta Radke
 Stanisław Radwan
 Artur Radźko
 Zbigniew Raj
 Paweł Rakowski
 Andrzej Ramlau
 Jolanta Raszyńska
 Edward Redliński
 Artur Reinhart
 Piotr Reisch
 Sławomir Rogowski
 Ewa Romanowska-Różewicz
 Henryk Romanowski
 Józef Romasz
 Dorota Roqueplo
 Michał Rosa
 Janusz Rosół
 Roland Rowiński
 Kazimierz Rozwałka
 Małgorzata Rożniatowska
 Stanisław Różewicz
 Agnieszka Różycka
 Wanda Różycka-Zborowska
 Andrzej Różycki
 Piotr Rubik
 Katarzyna Rudnik
 Magdalena Rutkiewicz-Luterek
 Natalia Rybicka
 Andrzej Rychcik
 Zbigniew Safjan
 Monika Sajko-Gradowska
 Sławomir Salamon
 Wojciech Saloni-Marczewski
 Jarosław Sander
 Wiesław Saniewski
 Barbara Sass
 Jerzy Satanowski
 Anna Seitz-Wichłacz
 Andrzej Serdiukow
 Andrzej Seweryn
 Ryszard Sibilski
 Dariusz Sidor
 Adam Sikora
 Ireneusz Siwiński
 Ewa Skoczkowska
 Jerzy Skolimowski
 Jerzy Skrepiński
 Józef Skrzek
 Przemysław Skwirczyński
 Ewa Smal
 Wojciech Smarzowski
 Barbara Snarska
 Katarzyna Sobańska
 Witold Sobociński
 Anna Sokołowska-Korcelli
 Jacek Sokołowski
 Bogdan Solle
 Janusz Sosnowski
 Jacek Stachlewski
 Tomasz Stańko
 Wiesława Starska
 Allan Starski
 Piotr Starzak
 Joanna Stasiak-Szafrańska
 Małgorzata Stefaniak
 Andrzej Stempowski
 Danuta Stenka
 Janusz Stokłosa
 Justyna Stolarz
 Anna Strońska
 Irena Strzałkowska
 Maciej Strzembosz
 Maciej Stuhr
 Jerzy Stuhr
 Bolesław Sulik
 Roman Suszyński
 Dariusz Szafrański
 Grażyna Szapołowska
 Waldemar Szarek
 Jerzy Szebesta
 Andrzej Szenajch
 Konrad Szołajski
 Krzysztof Szpetmański
 Jerzy Sztwiertnia
 Piotr Szulkin
 Andrzej Szulkowski
 Borys Szyc
 Włodzimierz Śliwiński
 Paweł Śmietanka
 Jerzy Śnieżawski
 Barbara Śródka-Makówka
 Julita Świercz-Wieczyńska
 Anna Świerkocka
 Maciej Świerkocki
 Tomasz Tarasin
 Kazimierz Tarnas
 Roman Tarwacki
 Marian Terlecki
 Magdalena Tesławska
 Wojciech Todorow
 Arkadiusz Tomiak
 Bartłomiej Topa
 Jerzy Trela
 Marek Trojak
 Piotr Trzaskalski
 Zbigniew Trzciński
 Andrzej Trześniewski
 Andrzej Trzos-Rastawiecki
 Jacek Turewicz
 Leszek Turowski
 Krzysztof Tusiewicz
 Tymon Tymański
 Wojciech Waglewski
 Anna Wagner
 Witold Wajcht
 Andrzej Wajda
 Aleksander Walczak
 Rafał Waltenberger
 Grzegorz Warchoł
 Janusz Wąchała
 Paweł Wendorff
 Piotr Wereśniak
 Zbigniew Wichłacz
 Rafał Wieczyński
 Piotr Wierzejski
 Maria Wiłun
 Tomasz Wiszniewski
 Ewa Wiśniewska
 Robert Wiśniewski
 Sławomir Witczak
 Renata Własow-Skóra
 Jolanta Włodarczyk
 Rafał Wnuk
 Krzysztof Wodziński
 Przemysław Wojcieszek
 Piotr Wojtowicz
 Andrzej Wolf
 Nikodem Wołk-Łaniewski
 Leszek Wosiewicz
 Izabela Woźny
 Izabela Wójcik
 Jerzy Wójcik
 Wojciech Wójcik
 Marek Wronko
 Janusz Wróblewski
 Waldemar Wróblewski
 Anna Wunderlich
 Andrzej Wyrozębski
 Janusz Yanina Iwański
 Małgorzata Zacharska
 Krystyna Zachwatowicz
 Jadwiga Zajicek
 Zbigniew Zamachowski
 Krzysztof Zanussi
 Janusz Zaorski
 Zbigniew Zapasiewicz
 Ernest Zawada
 Dariusz Zawiślak
 Wanda Zeman
 Maciej Zieliński
 Wojciech Zimiński
 Iwona Ziułkowska-Okapiec
 Maria Zmarz-Koczanowicz
 Wiesław Znyk
 Filip Zylber
 Andrzej Żabicki
 Jarosław Żamojda
 Michał Żarnecki
 Michał Żebrowski
 Edward Żebrowski
 Zbigniew Żmigrodzki
 Wojciech Żogała
 Zofia Żydaczewska
 Marek Żydowicz

See also 
 Cinema of Poland
 Gdynia Film Festival
 Warsaw Film Festival

References

Polish film awards
Film organisations in Poland
2003 establishments in Poland
Organizations established in 2003